A Long Hot Summer is the third solo album from American emcee Masta Ace. The release is a follow-up to his 2001 concept album Disposable Arts. It was extremely well received by both fans and critics, however sales were poor. The story follows Ace, an underground rapper through his "Long Hot Summer" in Brooklyn, accompanied by buddy Fats Belvedere. Ace ventures through the Brooklyn streets and goes out on tour with Fats as his unofficial manager.

A Long Hot Summer was well received from critics with a Metacritic score of 78/100 based on 10 reviews.

Track listing

Cast
Masta Ace: Himself
Fatz Belvedere: Himself
"E": Frankie Aikens
Hotel Maintenance Guy: Franklyn Grant, Jr.
Promoter: Steve Dent
Cell Mate: Michael Rapaport

Samples
The Count
"Down and Out in New York City" by James Brown
"Goodbye Pork Pie Hat" by Charles Mingus
Big City
"Think of Your Thoughts as Children" by Philippé Wynne
Good Ol' Love
"Give Me Some of That Good Old Love" by Willie Hutch
"Hospital Prelude of Love Theme" by Willie Hutch
Excerpts from the film The Original Kings Of Comedy
Da Grind
"How Long Will It Last" by Jerry Butler & Brenda Lee Eager
"Hate Me Now" by Nas
H.O.O.D.
"Stares and Whispers" by Freda Payne
Beautiful
"Wishing on a Star" by Rose Royce
F.A.Y
"Better Off Dead" by Ice Cube
Soda & Soap
"Black Gold" by Phil Upchurch
Bklyn Masala
"Sailing" by Christopher Cross
"You Won't See Me Tonight" by Nas
Travelocity
"Tu Etais Trop Jolie" by Charles Aznavour
The Stoop
"Don't Give Me No Bammer Weed" by RBL Posse
The Ways
"Monochrome" by Alan Parker
Oh My God
"Punk Rock Rap" by The Cold Crush Brothers
"Get It Together" by Beastie Boys feat. Q-Tip

Album singles

Charts

References

2004 albums
Masta Ace albums
Albums produced by 9th Wonder
Albums produced by Khrysis
Albums produced by DJ Spinna
Albums produced by Marco Polo